is a Japanese composer and arranger. He has provided the music for several anime series, such as Date A Live and Digimon Adventure tri., as well as television dramas and movies—especially tokusatsu—, such as the Kamen Rider series. His works also include opening and ending theme songs for many series and video games.

Biography 
Sakabe was born in Japan, in 1982. He began learning piano in the first grade of elementary school. Around his junior high school, he used to compose songs at home, using the music notation software Finale. In high school, he joined the choir club and became more familiar with music. In the winter of his second year of high school, he decided to go to a music college, and later entered the Department of Composition at Kunitachi College of Music. After that, Sakabe studied under Toshihiko Sahashi—a composer and arranger—, while working as his assistant.

Sakabe's musician career started in 2005, with him involved in writing songs for other artists.

In 2007, he made his debut as a series composer with the opening theme song "I Say Yes" from the season 2 of the anime The Familiar of Zero.

Works

Anime

Television dramas

Movies

Video games

References

External links 

 
 Discography at VGMdb
 
 

1982 births
21st-century Japanese composers
21st-century Japanese male musicians
Anime composers
Japanese film score composers
Japanese male composers
Japanese male film score composers
Japanese male musicians
Japanese music arrangers
Japanese television composers
Kunitachi College of Music alumni
Living people
Male television composers
Video game composers